Herdaiv is a village in Pakistan, about 10 kilometers north of Sheikhupura.

Villages in Sheikhupura District